Van Long Wetland Nature Reserve is a nature reserve in Gia Viễn District, along the Northeastern border of Ninh Binh Province, Vietnam. The site is one of the few intact lowland inland wetlands remaining in the Hong River Delta. Limestone karst is surrounded by the freshwater lake, marshes and swamps. Together with subterranean hydrological systems they form a wetland complex, which is very rare in the Mainland Southeast Asia. Van Long Wetland Nature Reserve is a habitat for the critically endangered Delacour's langur and is the only place where the species can be observed in the wild.

References

External links
 Van Long Wetland Nature Reserve Report

Wetlands of Vietnam
Ramsar sites in Vietnam